William Pfaender Sr. (Jakob Wilhelm Pfänder, July 6, 1826 – August 11, 1905) was a German-American politician and businessman.

Biography
Born in Heilbronn, Germany, Pfaender emigrated to the United States in 1848 and went to New York. In 1848, he moved to Cincinnati, Ohio. In 1856, after an attack by Know Nothings on his family and other German immigrant families at a picnic, Pfaender organized a move to New Ulm, Minnesota Territory. Pfaender was in the real estate and insurance business; he was also in the lumber business. During the American Civil War, Pfaender served in the 1st Minnesota Volunteer Infantry and was commissioned lieutenant colonel. Pfaender served on the New Ulm City Council. He also served as mayor of New Ulm and on the New Ulm school board. He served as register for Brown County, Minnesota and as postmaster for New Ulm. In 1859 and 1860, Pfaender served in the Minnesota House of Representatives and was a Republican. Then, from 1869 to 1873, Pfeander served in the Minnesota State Senate. From 1876 to 1880, Pfaender served as the Minnesota State Treasurer. Pfaender died at his home in New Ulm, Minnesota.

Family
His great-great-grandniece is singer Victoria Beckham.

Notes

External links

1826 births
1905 deaths
German emigrants to the United States
People from New Ulm, Minnesota
People of Minnesota in the American Civil War
Businesspeople from Minnesota
Minnesota city council members
School board members in Minnesota
County officials in Minnesota
State treasurers of Minnesota
Republican Party Minnesota state senators
Republican Party members of the Minnesota House of Representatives
Minnesota postmasters
19th-century American politicians
19th-century American businesspeople
Mayors of places in Minnesota
People from Heilbronn